This article contains information about the literary events and publications of 1854.

Events

March 2 – An adaptation of Shakespeare's The Merchant of Venice into Bengali, Bhānumatī-chittavilās by Hara Chandra Ghosh, is staged; also, Dinabandhu Mitra introduces Falstaff in Nabin Tapaswini.
March 20 – The Boston Public Library opens to the public in the United States.
April 1 – August 12 – Charles Dickens's novel Hard Times, is serialised in his magazine Household Words. From September 2, it is followed in the magazine by Elizabeth Gaskell's North and South, another social novel based in the Lancashire manufacturing district.
July – Publication begins of Anthony Trollope's novel Barchester Towers (1857).
November – Crimean War: Future novelist Leo Tolstoy arrives to take part as a defending soldier in the Siege of Sevastopol (1854–55). Off-duty he is reading Thackeray's novels in French translation.
December 14 – Wilkie Collins's "The Lawyer's Story of a Stolen Letter", published as "The Fourth Poor Traveller" in The Seven Poor Travellers – the Household Words special Christmas number – is the first non-police detective fiction published in Britain.
unknown dates
John Rollin Ridge's The Life and Adventures of Joaquín Murieta, The Celebrated California Bandit is the first novel by a Native American in the United States (writing as "Yellow Bird") to be published.
The Polyglotta Africana, an early classification of African languages based on field work under freed slaves in Freetown, Sierra Leone, is published by Sigismund Wilhelm Koelle.

New books

Fiction
Margaret Jewett Smith Bailey (anonymously) – The Grains, or, Passages in the Life of Ruth Rover, with Occasional Pictures of Oregon, Natural and Moral
Jules Amédée Barbey d'Aurevilly – L'Ensorcelée
William Wells Brown – Sketches of Places and People Abroad
Camilla Collett (anonymously) –  (The District Governor's Daughters, first part)
Wilkie Collins – Hide and Seek
John Esten Cooke – The Virginia Comedians
Maria Cummins – The Lamplighter
Charles Dickens – Hard Times
Fanny Fern – Ruth Hall
Mathilde Fibiger – Minona
Frederick Greenwood – The Loves of an Apothecary
Francesco Domenico Guerrazzi – Beatrice Cenci
Nathaniel Hawthorne – Mosses from an Old Manse
Caroline Lee Hentz – The Planter's Northern Bride
Mary Jane Holmes – Tempest and Sunshine
Mary Russell Mitford – Atherton
Gérard de Nerval – Les Filles du feu (short stories)
Charles Reade – The Courier of Lyons
Solon Robinson – Hot Corn
E. D. E. N. Southworth – The Lost Heiress
Leo Tolstoy – Boyhood («Отрочество», Otrochestvo)

Children and young people
Anna Eliza Bray – A Peep at the Pixies, or Legends of the West (illustrated by Phiz)

Drama
Émile Augier and Jules Sandeau – Le Gendre de M. Poirier
Andreas Munch – Salomon de Caus
Alexander Ostrovsky – Poverty is No Vice («Бедность не порок», Bednost ne porok)
Charles Reade – The Courier of Lyons
Zacharias Topelius – Regina von Emmeritz

Poetry
R. D. Blackmore – Poems by Melanter
Coventry Patmore – The Angel in the House
Emma Tatham – The Dream of Pythagoras and Other Poems
Alfred Tennyson – "The Charge of the Light Brigade"

Non-fiction
Samuel Bache – Exposition of Unitarian Views of Christianity
George Boole – The Laws of Thought
William Erskine with Claudius James Erskine – History of India under the two first sovereigns of the house of Taimur, Baber, and Humayun
F. W. Fairholt – Dictionary of Terms in Art
Ludwig Feuerbach – The Essence of Christianity (Das Wesen des Christentums)
Kuno Fischer – History of Modern Philosophy (Geschichte der neueren Philosophie), vol. 1
Elisha Kane – The U. S. Grinnell Expedition in Search of Sir John Franklin: a Personal Narrative
Eliphas Levi – Dogme et rituel de la haute magie (Dogma and Ritual of High Magic), vol. 1, Dogme
Theodor Mommsen – History of Rome (Römische Geschichte), vol. 1
John Neal – One Word More: Intended for the Reasoning and Thoughtful among Unbelievers
Henry David Thoreau – Walden, or Life in the Woods

Births
March 11 – Jane Meade Welch, American journalist and historian (died 1931)
March 13 – Kolachalam Srinivasa Rao, Indian dramatist (died 1919)
March 14 – Alexandru Macedonski, Romanian poet, novelist and dramatist (died 1920)
May 24 – Mona Caird, English novelist, essayist and feminist (died 1932)
May 25 – Clara Louise Burnham, née Root, American novelist (died 1927)
June 10
François, Vicomte de Curel, French dramatist (died 1928)
Sarah Grand, Irish author and women's rights advocate (died 1943)
July 7 – W. C. Morrow, American writer, noted for his stories of horror and suspense. (died 1923) 
August 2 – Francis Marion Crawford, American novelist (died 1909)
September 1 – Florence Trail, American educator and author (died 1944)
October 16 – Oscar Wilde, Irish dramatist, poet and wit (died 1900)
October 20
Alphonse Allais, French humorist (died 1905)
Arthur Rimbaud, French poet (died 1891)
unknown date - Eliza D. Keith, American educator, author, and journalist (died 1939)

Florence Trail (September 1, 1854 - April 21, 1944) was an

Deaths
January 5 – Gottschalk Eduard Guhrauer, German philologist and biographer (born 1809)
February 4 – George Watterston, American librarian of Congress (born 1783)
April 3 – John Wilson, Scottish poet and journalist (born 1785)
April 7 – Pierre-François Tissot, French historian and memoirist (born 1768)
April 16 – Julia Nyberg, Swedish poet (born 1784)
April 24 – Gabriele Rossetti, Italian poet (born 1783)
April 30 – James Montgomery, Scottish-born poet and hymnist (born 1771)
July 20 – Caroline Anne Southey (Caroline Anne Bowles), English poet (born 1786)
October 14 – Samuel Phillips, English journalist (born 1814)
November 5 – Susan Edmonstone Ferrier, Scottish novelist (born 1782)
November 25 – John Kitto, English Biblical commentator (born 1804)
December 9 – Almeida Garrett, Portuguese poet, novelist and dramatist (born 1799)

Awards
Chancellor's Gold Medal – Herbert John Reynolds
July – Opening of Anthony Trollope's novel Barchester Towers (1857).

References

 
Years of the 19th century in literature